While it is one of the smallest regions of Italy, the Music of Molise is active.

Musical venues and activities
The Teatro Savoia was built and opened in 1926 in Campobasso and then reopened in 2002. Campobasso has a friends of music association and, despite the region's small area, a symphony orchestra. The city is also the home of the Lorenzo Perosi music conservatory.

Isernia is known for its folk traditions and open-air festivals. The annual festival Mostra Mercato della Zampogna in Scapoli is held each July with exhibitions and markets for the zampogna, a folk version of bagpipes.

The Museum of the Zampogna in Scapoli has a permanent exhibit of local traditional as well as foreign instruments.

References

Further reading
Guide Cultura, i luoghi della music (2003) ed. Touring Club Italiano.

External links
 Concerts today in Molise
Campobasso music conservatory
 Bagpipe Museum
Molise Symphony Orchestra

Molise
Molise